Vari is a suburb of Athens, Greece.

Vary or Vári may also refer to:

Vari, Iran, a village in Mazandaran Province, Iran
Varima-te-takere, a goddess in Polynesian mythology
Van Andel Research Institute (VARI), a  biomedical research and education institute

People:
Attila Vári (born 1976), Hungarian water polo player, 
Barnabás Vári (born 1987), Hungarian football player
George Vari (1923–2010), Canadian real estate developer and philanthropist
Giuseppe Vari (1924–1993), Italian filmmaker
Gyula Vári (born 1967), Hungarian aviation officer and politician
Martin Vari (born 1982), Argentine kitesurfer 
Minnette Vári (born 1968), South African artist 
Zsolt Vari (born 1969), Hungarian sport shooter

See also
Very (disambiguation)
Vary (surname)
Varis, a given name and surname